Automotive Grade Linux (AGL) is an open source project hosted by The Linux Foundation that is building an open operating system and framework for automotive applications. AGL was launched in 2012 with founding members including Jaguar Land Rover, Nissan, Toyota, DENSO Corporation, Fujitsu, HARMAN, NVIDIA, Renesas, Samsung, and Texas Instruments (TI). Today, AGL has 150 members (including 10 automakers). Notably, IndyKite, Marelli, and Red Hat joined as members in April 2022.

Release history
Release notes contain details for each of the following:

 On June 30, 2014, AGL announced their first release, which was based on Tizen and was primarily for demo applications.
 AGL expanded the first reference platform with the Unified Code Base (UCB) distribution. The first UCB release, nicknamed Agile Albacore, was released in January 2016 and leverages software components from AGL, Tizen and GENIVI Alliance.
 UCB 2.0, nicknamed Brilliant Blowfish, was made available in July 2016 and included new features like rear seat display, video playback, audio routing and application framework.
 UCB 3.0, or Charming Chinook was released in January 2017 with Smart Device Link for Mobile Integration and a new Window Manager & SDK.
 UCB 4.0 (Daring Dab) was announced in early 2017 and released in August; features include Secure Over-the-Air (OTA), SmartDeviceLink integration,  and speech recognition APIs.
 UCB 5.0 (Electric Eel) was released in January 2018. Improved features included wider and more robust hardware support, support for control from multiple surfaces, audio management and OTA updates.
 UCB 6.0 (Funky Flounder) was made available in October 2018. Features include telematics systems, electronic instrument clusters.
 UCB 7.0 (Grumpy Gumpy) was released in March 2019 featuring a speech recognition API .
 UCB 8.0 (Happy Halibut) was released in August 2019 and decreased the footprint of AGL while increasing the modularity. It added Alexa integration as well as better Audio and CAN support.
 UCB 9.0 (Itchy Icefish) was made available in April 2020. Changes include improved speech recognition, network connectivity, HTML5 app performance, and support for various boards.
 UCB 10.0 (Jumping Jellyfish) was made available in November 2020. This update added Yocto 3.1 LTS and improved the system's build scripts.
 UCB 11.0 (Kooky Koi) was made available in February 2021. This brought more updates to Chromium, Yocto, and BSP.
 UCB 12.0 (Lucky Lamprey) was made available in July 2021. In addition to more updates for Chromium, Yocto, and BSP, this update also included improving continuous integration tests.
 UCB 13.0 (Magic Marlin) was made available in March 2022. This update deprecated Alexa Auto SDK and the old vehicle signal-composer framework.
 UCB 14.0 (Nifty Needlefish) was made available in August 2022. Updates were made to the instrument cluster, Yocto, and Flutter. An SBOM was also created.

Adoption History

On May 31, 2017, AGL announced that the 2018 Toyota Camry will be the first Toyota vehicle on the market with the AGL-based system in the United States.

On 30 January 2019, it was reported that the Mazda3 was using AGL.

As of April 2020, Mercedes Benz, Subaru and Toyota produce vehicles which make use of the UCB for their vehicles.

References

External links
Tizen 
Automotive Grade Linux website 
Automotive Linux Wiki

Automotive software
Dashboard head units
Embedded Linux
Embedded operating systems
Linux Foundation projects